Catocala meskei, or Meske's underwing, is a moth of the family Erebidae. The species was first described by Augustus Radcliffe Grote in 1873. It is found in North America from Maine and Quebec west to southern Alberta and Montana, south to South Carolina in the east and at least Montana in the west.

The wingspan is 65–75 mm. Adults are on wing from July to September depending on the location.

The larvae feed on Populus and Salix species.

Subspecies
Catocala meskei orion, described from Alberta, is now considered a synonym.

References

External links

meskei
Moths of North America
Moths described in 1873